Narnaul Airport, also Bachhod Airstrip, is an airstrip adjacent to Bhilwara village 10 km east of Narnaul city in the Indian state of Haryana. The airstrip is used mainly by Rajiv Gandhi National Centre for Aero Sports, which was inaugurated in 2010. The airstrip is owned by the Civil Aviation Department of Haryana government. It does not have any IATA or ICAO code. The code VINL listed in this article does not exist.

History

In 1948, first airstrip was built in Haryana when Ambala Air Force Station was established. Narnaul was established later in.

Infrastructure
Narnaul Airport has one hangar as well as one admin block cum VIP lounge. Airports Authority of India lists its runway strip dimension as 1058 x 23 m including leading space at front and back of runway. The airport has an admin-cum-VIP lounge and one hangar, but does not have night landing facility. It does not have any control tower and has no scheduled flights.

The Airports Authority of India lists its ICAO code as VI20 which is wrong because VI20 code is for Bhilwara airstrip.

Rajiv Gandhi National Centre for Aero Sports
On 31 January 2010, the Rajiv Gandhi National Centre for Aero Sports was inaugurated at Narnaul Airport. 51 acres were acquired for this purpose. Chief Minister Bhupinder Singh Hooda and Aero Club of India President Satish Sharma were present at the inauguration ceremony. The centre was set up by Aero Club of India and the Department of Civil Aviation, Haryana. It is the first ever modern state-of-the-art aero sports centre in India to provide training in comprehensive range of various aero sports, including para-jumping (simulated parachute jump from a tower), parasailing, hot air ballooning, gliding, power flying, sky diving, aero modelling and micro light flying, with the purpose of introducing the state's youth to aviation and providing the general population a cheap opportunity to experience aero sports.

Sky diving

Haryana govt has authorized the Pioneer Flying Academy to offer tandem skydiving and static line jumps from a Cessna 172 aircraft.

Future development
The finance minister of Haryana, while presenting the Government of Haryana 2018-19 budget in March 2018 announced  that the funds have been allocated to extend the existing 3000 feet runway to 5000 feet and parking hangar for the spillover aircraft from IGI Delhi airport will be constructed.

As of January 2019, construction of hangar is underway. Night landing facilities and hangar will also be built as airlines have approached the Haryana government to park their "Non-scheduled Air Operations" (NSOP) spillover aircarafts from the congested IGI airport at Delhi to Bhiwani and Narnaul airport. Consequently, all five existing government airports in Haryana will be developed to have runway of at least 5000 feet, night landing and parking hangars.

See also

 List of airports in India
 Airports Authority of India
 List of busiest airports in India
 List of Indian Air Force bases

 List of highways in Haryana
 Railway in Haryana

References

Defunct airports in India
Bhiwani district
Airports in Haryana
Airports with year of establishment missing